Baron Thomas Dimsdale  (29 May 1712 – 30 December 1800) was an English doctor, banker and politician who sat in the House of Commons from 1780 to 1790. He was created Baron Dimsdale of the Russian Empire by Catherine the Great.

Early life
He was born in Theydon Garnon, Essex, the son of John Dimsdale, a surgeon, and his wife Susan. The family were Quakers. He was trained in medicine by his father before training further at St Thomas’ Hospital, London, after which he began to practise medicine in Hertford in 1734.

Careers
Dimsdale developed a particular interest in the prevention of smallpox by inoculation (variolation), a deliberate infection of the patient via the skin with a mild form of the disease to give protection against more virulent strains. He published The present method of inoculating for the small-pox in 1767 which went into five editions by 1769. That year he was elected a Fellow of the Royal Society.

In 1762, perhaps due to his reputation within London society, he was invited to Russia to variolate the Empress Catherine the Great of Russia and her son, Grand Duke Paul. In 1768, Dimsdale, accompanied by his second son Nathaniel Dimsdale travelled to St Petersburg and inoculated the Empress, her son, and over 140 members of the Court. The results were a success and Catherine rewarded Dimsdale with £10,000, a pension of £500 per annum, £2000 expenses and a Barony of the Russian Empire. Nathaniel was also rewarded and he too received a Barony. In case the results had produced adverse effects, the Empress had arranged for a relay of fast horses to be available to speed the Dimsdales out of the country. During the long preparatory period before the variolations he wrote Tracts on inoculation written and published at St Petersburg in the year 1768. 

On his return from Russia, Dimsdale became a banker, initially in the private banking partnership of Dimsdale, Archer & Byde in Cornhill, London and afterwards as a partner in Staples, Baron Dimsdale, Son & Co. He was elected as MP for Hertford in two successive parliaments in 1780 and 1784. In 1781 he and Nathaniel returned to Russia to carry out further royal inoculations.

Family
He had married three times: firstly Mary, the daughter of Nathaniel Brassey of Roxford, Hertfordshire; secondly Anne, the daughter of John Iles, with whom he had seven sons and two daughters; and thirdly Elizabeth, the daughter of his cousin Joseph Dimsdale of Bishop's Stortford. He was succeeded in the Russian Barony by his eldest son John, from whom it descended within the family. The Barony of John's son Nathaniel lapsed when he died with no heir.

Death 
He lived in Bengeo a part of  Hertford, the  county town of Hertfordshire, where Dimsdale Street,  which partly bounded his land, still bears his name. He died in 1800 and was buried in the Quakers' burial-ground at Bishop's Stortford, Hertfordshire.

References

External links

 

 

1712 births
1800 deaths
People from Epping Forest District
18th-century English medical doctors
English bankers
Members of the Parliament of Great Britain for English constituencies
British MPs 1780–1784
British MPs 1784–1790
Barons of the Russian Empire
Fellows of the Royal Society
People from Hertford